The "Trinity murders" (so named for the high school attended by the victims) occurred in Louisville, Kentucky on September 29, 1984, when Victor Dewayne Taylor and George Ellis Wade kidnapped and murdered two 17-year-old Trinity High School students, Scott Christopher Nelson and Richard David Stephenson. Taylor was sentenced to death, and Wade was sentenced to life imprisonment.

Murders 
On September 29, 1984, Scott Nelson and Richard David Stephenson were headed to a Trinity High School soccer game at Louisville Male High School football stadium on East Burnett Avenue in the Schnitzelburg neighborhood of Louisville, Kentucky, when they became lost. The pair stopped at a  Moby Dick restaurant located at the intersection of Logan & Oak Street to get directions, where Victor Taylor and his cousin George Wade said they would lead them to the stadium in exchange for a ride. Nelson and Stephenson were instead taken to a vacant lot in the 300 block of Ardella Ct. near the football stadium of Louisville Male High School where they were forced to take off their clothes, hand over their personal property, and were bound and gagged. After Victor Taylor sexually assaulted one of them, Nelson and Stephenson were shot in the back of the head to avoid the identification of Taylor and Wade.

The widely publicized murders led to the suspects when a relative who had been given a Trinity High school jacket reported George Wade to the police. Wade implicated Victor Taylor in the crime, and the personal belongings of the two murdered students were found in the home of Taylor's mother.

Trial
After a change of venue motion due to publicity, the trials of Taylor and Wade were moved to Lexington, Kentucky where Taylor was convicted in 1986 of kidnapping, robbery, sodomy, and murder. Wade had previously testified against Taylor but recanted his testimony, which led to Taylor unsuccessfully appealing his conviction. George Wade was convicted of kidnapping, robbery, and murder. Taylor is on death row at the Kentucky State Penitentiary in Eddyville, Kentucky, and George Wade is serving a life sentence at the Kentucky State Reformatory in LaGrange Kentucky.

Wade recanted his statement to the police that Taylor was with him when he kidnapped, sodomized, and killed the boys. Wade made this statement more than eleven years after Taylor's conviction.

In popular culture 
In 2000, the clothier Benetton ran a controversial advertising campaign titled "We, On Death Row" which featured Victor Taylor and 24 other death row inmates from around the United States.

External links
Reporting Times
Rick Halperin - Death Penalty News, 29 January 2000
ABOLISH Archives, 13 January 2005
U.S. House of Representatives Resolution 4258, Committee on the Judiciary, September 17, 1998
Benetton - killer ads

References

1984 murders in the United States
Deaths by firearm in Kentucky
Crimes in Louisville, Kentucky
Murder in Kentucky
1984 in Kentucky
Murdered American children
Kidnappings in the United States
Sexual assaults in the United States
September 1984 events in the United States
Violence against men in North America